"In Private" is a song by British singer Dusty Springfield, released as a single on 20 November 1989. It was Springfield's third single in a row to be a chart success, after an absence of nearly two decades from the charts. Both "In Private" and Springfield's previous single, "Nothing Has Been Proved" were produced by Pet Shop Boys, who helped return Springfield to prominence with their 1987 hit collaboration "What Have I Done to Deserve This?". Both Springfield singles were included on her 1990 British album Reputation.

Releases and chart performances
"In Private" peaked at #14 in the British charts. It was a top ten hit in West Germany, the Netherlands, Israel, Belgium and Sweden. Though not released as a single in the United States, it proved to be popular with club DJs on both coasts and charted on the Hot 100 Dance/Club Play charts, also at #14. A separate remix single with an orange cover - as opposed to the other formats' colours of green (see right; also used for 12" and 7" versions) and purple (for the CD single) - was also released both on 12" and CD in certain territories, featuring three radically rearranged and remixed dance versions by Shep Pettibone.

Critical reception
Bruce Eder from AllMusic commented, "She seems to reach that much higher and also that much deeper inside of herself on 'In Private' and 'Daydreaming' to much subtler effect; those cuts are very much of a piece with her best work on the Dusty in Memphis, A Brand New Me, and Cameo albums". Paul Lester from Melody Maker opined that it "sounds like a last-minute rummage through the scrag-ends left deservedly on the studio floor and hastily slung together just in time for tea. Actually, it's not much more than a replay of Liza Minnelli-via-Hazell Dean's 'Love Pains'". A reviewer from Music & Media complimented the song as "a strong number in a 60s style." David Giles of Music Week described it as another Pet Shop Boys composition "with the duo characteristically mournful keyboards giving the song a somewhat tragic feel. It works perfectly for Dusty."

Cover versions
The song was later re-recorded and released in 2006 on Fundamentalism, the limited edition second disc released with the Pet Shop Boys' album Fundamental. A different mix of this recording appeared as the b-side to the single "Minimal", released the same year, and was subsequently included in the b-sides compilation Format. It is performed as a duet between Neil Tennant and Elton John. The fact that both of them are openly gay men makes all the more pointed the song's subject of a hidden relationship that one of the participants is ashamed to admit to, especially on the following lines: 
Tennant: "What you gonna say when you run back to your wife?" /
John: "I guess it's just the story of my life...!" /
Both: "What are you gonna say...?"

The song was also recorded by the Swedish pop group, Nouveau Riche, as a hidden track on their 2007 album "Pink Trash".  In 2008, it was covered by another Swedish band, Sahara Hotnights, peaking at 7th position at the Swedish singles chart.

In 1996, a Dutch cover version of the song was a big comeback hit for Flemish singer, Liliane Saint-Pierre.

Track listings
 7" single / Cassette
 "In Private" — 4:21
 "In Private" (instrumental) — 4:21

 12" maxi / CD maxi
 "In Private" (12" version) — 7:12
 "In Private" (7" version) — 4:24
 "In Private" (instrumental version) — 4:24

 12" maxi / CD maxi - Remixes
 "In Private" (remix) — 8:53
 "In Private" (dub) — 6:34
 "In Private" (bonus beats) — 3:56

Charts

Weekly charts

Year-end charts

Personnel
 Written and produced by Pet Shop Boys
 Backing vocals by Carol Kenyon and Katie Kissoon
 Co-produced and mixed and engineered by Julian Mendelsohn
 Assistant: Danton Supple
 Fairlight- and keyboard programming by Gary Maughan
 Remixes by Shep Pettibone
 Artwork by 3a
 Catalog#:
 on spine: 20 3618 6
 on back sleeve K: 060 20 3618 6
 on labels: 060-20 3618 6

References

1989 singles
1990 singles
Dusty Springfield songs
Pet Shop Boys
Songs written by Neil Tennant
Songs written by Chris Lowe
1989 songs
Parlophone singles
Sahara Hotnights songs